This is a list of children's animated television series (including internet television series); that is, animated programs originally targeted towards audiences aged 12 and under in mind.

This list does not include Japanese, Chinese, or Korean series, as children's animation is much more common in these regions.

2000s

United States

United Kingdom

Canada

Co-productions

References

Childrens 2000s
animated
Childrens 2000s
2000s television-related lists
 2000s